The Association of Mental Health Providers (AMHP), known until May 2017 as Mental Health Providers Forum (MHPF), is a registered charity based in London and the representative body for voluntary and community sector mental health organisations in England and Wales, working nationally and regionally to influence practice and policy. It aims to improve the range and quality of mental health services by increasing the involvement of the voluntary sector in delivering them, working in partnership with the wider sector and government agencies. Specific projects include the promotion of innovation in the sector, evidencing best practice to achieve the best outcomes for individuals and supporting recovery.

The Association leads a collaboration of voluntary mental health organisations including the Centre for Mental Health, National Survivor User Network for Mental Health (NSUN), the Mental Health Foundation, Mind and Rethink Mental Illness in the VCSE Health and Wellbeing Alliance with the Department of Health, NHS England and Public Health England.

The Association's membership consists of voluntary sector organisations providing mental health services in England. The current Chief Executive (since April 2012) is Kathy Roberts, who has a background in health and social care and the voluntary and community sector. She succeeded Dr Ian McPherson, previously Director of the National Mental Health Development Unit. The first Chief Executive of the Forum was Judy Weleminsky, who led the organisation from December 2005 to January 2011.

The Association has increased its work to bring the views of mental health service providers into national policy and strategy discussions, working closely with members to inform and implement the 2011 No health without mental health cross-government mental health strategy. An area of focus from 2014 has been housing provision for people with mental health needs. In September 2014, AMHP published a report outlining successful housing models and a national forum is now established.

Mental Health Recovery Star
In 2008 the Association, with Triangle Consulting, worked with service users and the Association's members to develop the Mental Health Recovery Star, part of a family of "Outcomes Stars", which was recommended by the Department of Health New Horizons programme and has been developed for use in adult mental health services. The Recovery Star is a key-working tool that enables staff to support individuals they work with to understand their recovery and plot their progress. It is also an outcomes tool that enables organisations to measure and assess the effectiveness of the services they deliver. It is now being used by many mental health trusts in England and has also been adopted for use by the Mental Health Recovery Service in Queensland, Australia.

See also
Child and Adolescent Mental Health Services
Improving Access to Psychological Therapies
 Mental health in the United Kingdom
Other UK mental health charities
Centre for Mental Health
Mental Health Foundation
Mind
Rethink Mental Illness
Richmond Fellowship
SANE
Together for Mental Wellbeing
Turning Point

Notes

References

Further reading

External links
Official website

2005 establishments in England
Charities based in London
Mental health in England
Mental health in Wales
Mental health organisations in the United Kingdom
Non-profit organisations based in England
Organizations established in 2005